Amme Anupame is a 1977 Indian Malayalam film,  directed by K. S. Sethumadhavan and produced by K. S. R. Moorthy. The film stars Sharada, K. P. Ummer, Vidhubala and Sukumari in the lead roles. The film has musical score by M. S. Viswanathan.

Cast

Sharada
K. P. Ummer
Vidhubala
Sukumari
Pattom Sadan
Prameela
Sankaradi
Sridevi
Sreelatha Namboothiri
M. G. C. Sukumar
Baby Sumathi
Nedumangad Krishnan

Soundtrack
The music was composed by M. S. Viswanathan and the lyrics were written by Mankombu Gopalakrishnan.

References

External links
 

1977 films
1970s Malayalam-language films
Films scored by M. S. Viswanathan
Films directed by K. S. Sethumadhavan